An order unit is an element of an ordered vector space which can be used to bound all elements from above. In this way (as seen in the first example below) the order unit generalizes the unit element in the reals.

According to H. H. Schaefer, "most of the ordered vector spaces occurring in analysis do not have order units."

Definition 

For the ordering cone  in the vector space , the element  is an order unit (more precisely an -order unit) if for every  there exists a  such that  (that is).

Equivalent definition 

The order units of an ordering cone  are those elements in the algebraic interior of  that is, given by

Examples 

Each interior point of the positive cone of an ordered topological vector space is an order unit.

Properties 

Each order unit of an ordered TVS is interior to the positive cone for the order topology.

If  is a preordered vector space over the reals with order unit  then the map  is a sublinear functional.

Order unit norm 

Suppose  is an ordered vector space over the reals with order unit  whose order is Archimedean and let  

References

Bibliography

  
  

Mathematical analysis
Topology